A Loud House Christmas is a live-action Christmas comedy adventure family television film based on the Nickelodeon animated series, The Loud House. The film is directed by Jonathan Judge, written by Liz Maccie, and stars Wolfgang Schaeffer, Jahzir Bruno, Lexi DiBenedetto, Dora Dolphin, Sophia Woodward, Catherine Ashmore Bradley, Morgan McGill, Aubin Bradley, Lexi Janicek, Mia Allan, Ella Allan, Charlotte Anne Tucker, Lainey Jane Knowles, and Muretta Moss while Catherine Taber and Brian Stepanek reprise their respective roles from the animated series as characters Katherine Mulligan and Lynn Loud Sr. The first live-action work and second film in the overall franchise after The Loud House Movie, it aired on Nickelodeon on November 26, 2021, and started streaming on Paramount+ the same day.

A live-action television series sequel called The Really Loud House, featuring several cast members from the film, premiered November 3, 2022.

Plot
The Loud family is preparing for Christmas as Lincoln mentions that Christmas can get pretty hectic in the Loud House. Everyone gathers in the kitchen for breakfast except for Lori who is away at Fairway University. Lori mentions on the video chat that it would be too much to come join them. Lincoln disagrees as Christmas is about being together. Everyone else mentions that they have something else to do: Luna is going skiing with Sam, Luan has a gig at Sunset Canyon Retirement Home, and Lynn Sr. and Rita plan to take everyone else to Miami Beach, Florida. He gets a package that turns out to be a 13-person toboggan to use on Tall Timbers Hill and opens it in front of his family only to find that it broke during the delivery.

Lincoln and his best friend Clyde make a plan on how to get the family together for Christmas. They make Lori homesick, fool Luna into thinking that Mick wants to jam with her, build a Sharkodile out of Clyde's family's film props, and disguise themselves as elderly people at the Sunset Canyon Retirement Home to pull off pranks enough for Pop-Pop to cancel Luan's gig. Lori enlists Bobby to get her to Royal Woods on his moped. Later on, while getting ready for the tree-lighting ceremony, Lincoln finds that he only made things worse for the family, having accidentally sprayed Lisa's custom-built Sharkodile repellent on Lynn Sr. causing him to not see straight, lose balance, and have unintelligible speech.

As Rita goes to pick up a stranded Lori and Bobby, Lincoln tries to call Katherine Mulligan and tell her that the creature isn't real, making her believe that he's pranking her. So, he and Clyde pilot the Sharkodile down Franklin Avenue where they drag some of the Loud House's decorations. They crash it into Royal Woods Mall just as the Louds, the McBrides, Rip, and Katherine catch up while Pop-Pop is among those seeing it on the news. Lincoln confesses the truth to everyone that he didn't want his family to be apart on Christmas. His family forgives him with his parents admitting that no Christmas tradition can be broken.

While mentioning that he has 300 hours of community service for the Sharkodile incident, Lincoln also mentions that Luna and Sam have their skiing trip back on, Luan's gig is reinstated by Pop-Pop, Lori will be taken back to Fairway University, and the rest of the family will be heading to Miami. Rita leads the family in presenting Lincoln with the rebuilt toboggan named Sledzilla. With help from Lisa's successful experiment, Lincoln, his sisters, his parents, and Clyde have a snowball fight. Then they ride Sledzilla down Tall Timbers Hill.

Cast

 Wolfgang Schaeffer as Lincoln Loud
 Jahzir Bruno as Clyde McBride
 Lexi DiBenedetto as Lori Loud
 Dora Dolphin as Leni Loud
 Sophia Woodward as Luna Loud
 Catherine Ashmore Bradley as Luan Loud
 Morgan McGill as Lynn Loud
 Aubin Bradley as Lucy Loud
 Mia Allan as Lana Loud
 Ella Allan as Lola Loud
 Lexi Janicek as Lisa Loud
 Charlotte Ann Tucker and Lainey Jane Knowles as Lily Loud
 Catherine Taber as Katherine Mulligan
 Muretta Moss as Rita Loud
 Brian Stepanek as Lynn Loud Sr.
 Matt Van Smith as Bobby Santiago
 Zoë DuVall as Sam Sharp
 Justin Michael Stevenson as Howard McBride
 Marcus Folmar as Harold McBride
 Bill Southworth as Pop-Pop
 Jill Jane Clements as Scoots
 Gail Everett-Smith as Nana Gayle
 Jeff Bennett as the voice of Mick Swagger
 Brian Patrick Wade as Rip Hardcore
 John Mullins as Mall Santa
 Garrett Hammond as Bill the Delivery Driver
 Kathleen Shugrue as Audrey Hoffman
 Saron Frank as a Sunset Canyon resident
 Joy A. Kennelly as a shopper
 Courtney Mason as a Fairway University Coach

Production
The film was first announced on February 19, 2020, it was originally set to be released in 2020. It was delayed. On March 18, 2021, it was announced that production would begin next month. The same day, it was announced that Wolfgang Schaeffer were cast as Lincoln and Jahzir Bruno were cast as Clyde. Production began in April 2021 in Atlanta with the working title The Loud House: A Very Loud Christmas! On August 23, 2021, Nickelodeon revealed the full cast. The movie was released on Nickelodeon and Paramount+ on November 26, 2021, as previously announced on October 15, 2021.

Release 
The film premiered on November 26, 2021, on Nickelodeon and Paramount+.

Reception
The special drew a 1.9/383,000 among Kids 2–11, a 2.1/252,000 with Kids 6-11 and drew 881,000 total viewers in Live+Same Day making it TV's top kids entertainment telecast of 2021. The had 3.1 millions view on the original premiere.

Sequel television series

On March 24, 2022, a live-action television series sequel to A Loud House Christmas was announced to have been ordered to series for the Paramount+ streaming service, with the main cast members of the film reprising their roles, in particular Wolfgang Schaeffer as Lincoln and Jahzir Bruno as Clyde, with the film retroactively being considered the series' television pilot. Filming for the series began in Albuquerque, New Mexico in June 2022. In September 2022, it was announced that the series, titled The Really Loud House, would instead premiere on Nickelodeon. On October 5, 2022, it was announced that the series would premiere on November 3, 2022.

See also
 List of Nickelodeon original films
 List of Christmas films

References

2021 films
2021 comedy films
2021 television films
2020s English-language films
American adventure comedy films
2020s adventure comedy films
Christmas television films
Films based on animated television series
Films shot in Atlanta
Films set in Michigan
Live-action films based on animated series
The Loud House
Nickelodeon original films
Paramount+ original films
Films about families